Philip Rosenberg may refer to:

 Philip Rosenberg (born 1935), American production designer
 Charlie Phil Rosenberg (1902–1976), American boxer